The Pau-Brasil Ecological Station ( is an ecological station in state of Paraíba, Brazil. It protects a stand of the endangered Pau Brazil (Brazil Wood) trees, and is home to the endangered blond capuchin (Sapajus flavius).

Location

Pau-Brasil Ecological Station was created by state decree 22,881 of 25 March 2002.
It is in the northern part of the municipality of Mamanguape, on the north coast of Paraíba.
The soils are mostly sandy or clay, with low fertility.
The climate is humid tropical, with a dry summer and rainy winter.
It is one of two conservation units in the municipality, the other being the Guaribas Biological Reserve.

Conservation

The Pau-Brazil (Caesalpinia echinata) is a native species of the Atlantic Forest that has been heavily exploited since the European discovery of Brazil. 
The tree has almost disappeared due to the devastation of coastal forests, and is officially listed as being threatened with extinction.
A 2006 study of the trees of this species in the conservation unit indicated that over time mortality was exceeding replacement.
The station also holds the endangered blond capuchin (Sapajus flavius).
Sudema plans to create a headquarters office to support management, sustainable tourism, environmental education and scientific research, and also to create a nursery for Brazil wood seedlings.

Notes

Sources

2002 establishments in Brazil
Ecological stations of Brazil
Protected areas of Paraíba
Protected areas established in 2002
Protected areas of the Atlantic Forest